Paota is a monotypic moth genus in the family Geometridae described by George Duryea Hulst in 1896. Its only species, Paota fultaria, was first described by Augustus Radcliffe Grote in 1882. It is found in North America.

The MONA or Hodges number for Paota fultaria is 7127.

References

Further reading

 
 
 
 
 
 
 
 
 

Sterrhini
Articles created by Qbugbot
Moths described in 1882
Monotypic moth genera